, also known as , is the Japanese art of repairing broken pottery by mending the areas of breakage with lacquer dusted or mixed with powdered gold, silver, or platinum; the method is similar to the  technique. As a philosophy, it treats breakage and repair as part of the history of an object, rather than something to disguise.

Origin
While the process is associated with Japanese craftsmen, the technique was also applied to ceramic pieces of other origins including China, Vietnam, and Korea.

One theory is that  may have originated when Japanese  Ashikaga Yoshimasa sent a damaged Chinese tea bowl back to China for repairs in the late 15th century. When it was returned, repaired with ugly metal staples, it may have prompted Japanese craftsmen to look for a more aesthetically pleasing means of repair. It is also possible that a pottery piece was chosen for deformities it had acquired during production, then deliberately broken and repaired, instead of being trashed. On the other hand, according to Bakōhan Saōki (record of tea-bowl with a 'large-locust' clamp), such "ugliness" was considered inspirational and Zen-like, as it connoted beauty in broken things. The bowl became valued even more highly because of these large metal staples, which looked like a locust, and the bowl was named  ("large-locust clamp").

Philosophy

Japanese aesthetics values marks of wear from the use of an object. This can be seen as a rationale for keeping an object around even after it has broken; it can also be understood as a justification of  itself, highlighting cracks and repairs as events in the life of an object, rather than allowing its service to end at the time of its damage or breakage. The philosophy of kintsugi can also be seen as a variant of the adage, "Waste not, want not".

Materials and types of joinery
There are a few major styles or types of :
 , the use of gold dust and resin or lacquer to attach broken pieces with minimal overlap or fill-in from missing pieces
 , where a replacement ceramic fragment is not available and the entirety of the addition is gold or gold/lacquer compound
 , where a similarly shaped but non-matching fragment is used to replace a missing piece from the original vessel creating a patchwork effect
Some key materials of kintsugi are: ki urushi (pure urushi), bengara urushi (iron red urushi), mugi urushi (a mixture of 50% ki ururshi and 50% wheat flour), sabi urushi (a mixture of ki urushi with two kinds of clay), and a storage compartment referred to as a furo ("bath" in Japanese) where the mended pottery can rest at 90% humidity for between 2 days to 2 weeks as the urushi hardens. Traditionally, a wooden cupboard and bowls of hot water were used as the furo. Alternatively, thick cardboard boxes are sometimes used as the furo as they create a steady atmosphere of humidity or large vessels filled with rice, beans, or sand into which the mended pottery is submerged.

Related techniques

Staple repair is a similar technique used to repair broken ceramic pieces, where small holes are drilled on either side of a crack and metal staples are bent to hold the pieces together. Staple repair was used in Europe (in ancient Greece, England and Russia among others) and China as a repair technique for particularly valuable pieces.

Influence on contemporary art, design, and culture
 is the general concept of highlighting or emphasizing imperfections, visualizing mends and seams as an additive or an area to celebrate or focus on, rather than absence or missing pieces. Modern artists and designers experiment with the ancient technique as a means of analyzing the idea of loss, synthesis, and improvement through destruction and repair or rebirth. While originally ignored as a separate art form,  and related repair methods have been featured at exhibitions at the Freer Gallery at the Smithsonian, the Metropolitan Museum of Art, and the Herbert F. Johnson Museum of Art.

Examples of contemporary artists and designers who incorporate kintsugi techniques, aesthetics, and philosophies in their work include:

 British artist Charlotte Bailey, who was inspired by kintsugi to create textile works involving the repair of broken vases; her practice involves covering the shards with fabric and stitching them back together using gold metallic thread. 
American artist Karen LaMonte, who creates monumental sculptures of women’s clothing worn by seemingly invisible human figures; when a kiln explosion broke a number of these works, LaMonte used kintsugi techniques to repair the ceramic sculptures with gold.
 New York designer George Inaki Root, who worked with Japanese artisans to create a line for his jewelry company Milamore entitled "Kintsugi"; Root told Forbes that the designs were inspired by themes of beauty and brokenness, and his longstanding connection to kintsugi philosophies. 
 Los Angeles artist Victor Solomon, who was inspired by kintsugi practices and philosophies to create "Kintsugi Court", a fractured public basketball court in South Los Angeles he repaired with gold-dusted resin. The project was finished in 2020 to coincide with the restart of the NBA season, which had been paused due to the Covid-19 pandemic.

See also

References

Further reading

External links 

Video: "Kintsugi: The Art of Repairing and Bringing New Life to Broken Items" from Link TV
Exhibition FLICKWERK The Aesthetics of Mended Japanese Ceramics at Herbert F. Johnson Museum of Art, Ithaca NY 2008
 Kintsugi: The Art of Broken by Audrey Harris | TEDxJanpath (video on YouTube)
 Kintsugi: The Meaning of Mending by Adam Fulford (video on Vimeo)
 EASTERN PHILOSOPHY - Kintsugi by School of Life (video on YouTube)
 The Art of Kintsugi | Transformation through Brokenness & Restoration by Klaus Motoki Tonn Finde Zukunft (video on YouTube)
 Kintsugi the Japanese art of mending broken pottery with gold

Ceramic art
Conservation and restoration of cultural heritage
Japanese aesthetics
Japanese art terminology
Japanese pottery
Japanese words and phrases